The 2005 Golden Globes (Portugal) were the tenth edition of the Golden Globes (Portugal).

Winners and nominees

Cinema:
Best Film: Noite Escura, with João Canijo
 nominated: A Costa dos Murmúrios, with Margarida Cardoso
 nominated: André Valente, with Catarina Ruivo
 nominated: O Milagre Segundo Salomé, with Mário BarrosoBest Actor: Nicolau Breyner, in Kiss Me, and O Milagre Segundo Salomé nominated: Fernando Luís, in Noite Escura nominated: Filipe Duarte, in A Costa dos Murmúrios, and O Milagre Segundo Salomé nominated: Leonardo Viveiros, in André ValenteBest Actress: Beatriz Batarda, in A Costa dos Murmúrios, and Noite Escuranominated: Mónica Calle, in A Costa dos Murmúriosnominated: Rita Blanco, in Noite Escuranominated: Rita Durão, in André Valente''

References

2004 film awards
2004 music awards
2004 television awards
Golden Globes (Portugal)
2005 in Portugal